This article lists the Prophet-Presidents of the Community of Christ. The included persons have served as President of the organization. The Community of Christ was formerly (1872–2001) known as the Reorganized Church of Jesus Christ of Latter Day Saints (RLDS).

Timeline

Notes 

 
Latter Day Saint movement lists
Prophet-Presidents of the Community of Christ